Events from the year 1451 in France

Incumbents
 Monarch – Charles VII

Events
 14 February - Louis XI of France marries Charlotte of Savoy 
 30 June - French forces capture Bordeaux
 20 August - French forces take Bayonne the last remaining English stronghold in the region

References

1450s in France